Jules Hendrickx (9 September 1899 – 19 January 1973) was a Belgian racing cyclist. He rode in the 1928 Tour de France.

References

1899 births
1973 deaths
Belgian male cyclists
Place of birth missing